The Director of the Cybersecurity and Infrastructure Security Agency is a high level civilian official in the United States Department of Homeland Security. The Director, as head of Cybersecurity and Infrastructure Security Agency at DHS, is the principal staff assistant and adviser to both the Secretary of Homeland Security and the Deputy Secretary of Homeland Security for all DHS programs designed to reduce the nation's risk to terrorism and natural disasters. The Director is appointed from civilian life by the President with the consent of the Senate to serve at the pleasure of the President.

The position was created in November 2018, replacing the position of Under Secretary of Homeland Security for National Protection and Programs.

Overview
The Director of the Cybersecurity and Infrastructure Security Agency is responsible for directing all of the Department of Homeland Security's integrated efforts to reduce the risk of terrorism and natural disasters to the Nation's physical, cyber and communications infrastructure.

The Director is a Level III position within the Executive Schedule. As of January 2022, the annual rate of pay for Level III is $187,300.

Directors

Reporting officials
Officials reporting to the Director of the CISA include:
Deputy Director of CISA - Nitin Natarajan
Executive Director of CISA - Brandon Wales
Executive Assistant Director for Cybersecurity Division (CSD) - Eric Goldstein
Executive Assistant Director for Infrastructure Security Division (ISD) - Dr. David Mussington
Executive Assistant Director for Emergency Communications (ECD) - Billy Bob Brown, Jr.
Assistant Director for National Risk Management Center (NRMC) - Mona Harrington (Acting)
Assistant Director for Integrated Operations Division (IOD) - Bridget Bean
Assistant Director for Stakeholder Engagement Division (SED) - Alaina Clark

References